The 2016 Atlantic Coast Conference football season was the 64th season of college football play for the Atlantic Coast Conference (ACC), played from September 2016 to January 2017. The Atlantic Coast Conference consists of 14 members in two divisions. The Atlantic Division consists of Boston College, Clemson, Florida State, Louisville, North Carolina State, Syracuse, and Wake Forest. The Coastal Division consists of Duke, Georgia Tech, Miami, North Carolina, Pittsburgh, Virginia, and Virginia Tech. The two division champions met on December 3 in the 2016 ACC Championship Game. The game was originally scheduled to be played at Bank of America Stadium in Charlotte, North Carolina, but on September 14 the conference announced that the game would be moved to a neutral venue outside of North Carolina due to the controversy surrounding the Public Facilities Privacy & Security Act (commonly known as House Bill 2, or HB2).

Preseason

Preseason Poll
The 2016 ACC Preseason Poll was announced following the ACC Football Kickoff meetings in Charlotte, North Carolina on July 21–22. North Carolina and Clemson were each selected to repeat in their respective divisions. Deshaun Watson of Clemson was once again voted the Preseason ACC Player of the Year.  It was voted on by 191 media members, all of which were in attendance for the ACC Football Kickoff.

Atlantic Division poll
 Clemson – 1,293 (148 first place votes)
 Florida State – 1,176 (42)
 Louisville – 961 (1)
 North Carolina State – 704
 Boston College – 441
 Syracuse – 426
 Wake Forest – 347

Coastal Division poll
 North Carolina – 1,238 (121)
 Miami – 1,108 (50)
 Pittsburgh – 859 (14)
 Virginia Tech – 697 (3)
 Duke – 597 (2)
 Georgia Tech – 588 (1)
 Virginia – 261

Preseason ACC Player of the Year
 Deshaun Watson, CLEM – 164
 Dalvin Cook, FSU – 18
 Elijah Hood, UNC – 4
 Brad Kaaya, MIA – 2
 Lamar Jackson, LOU – 2
 DeVon Edwards, DU – 1

Preseason All Conference Teams

Offense

Defense

Specialist

Coaches

Note: Stats shown are before the beginning of the season

Rankings

Postseason

Bowl games

* Rankings based on CFP rankings

All-conference teams 

First Team

Second Team

Third Team

ACC individual awards

ACC Player of the Year
 Lamar Jackson, Louisville 

Rookie of the Year
 Deondre Francois, Florida State 

Coach of the Year
 Justin Fuente, Virginia Tech

Offensive Player of the Year
  Lamar Jackson

Offensive Rookie of the Year
 Deondre Francois, Florida State 

Jacobs Blocking Trophy
 Roderick Johnson, Florida State 

Defensive Player of the Year
 DeMarcus Walker, Florida State 

Defensive Rookie of the Year
 Dexter Lawrence, Clemson

Home game attendance

Bold – Exceeded capacity
†Season High

NFL Draft

References